Ascent MKE is a mass timber hybrid high-rise apartment building in Milwaukee, Wisconsin. The 284-foot (87 meter), 25-story high-rise is the world's tallest mass timber structure, edging out Norway's Mjøstårnet. It features 259 luxury apartments, retail space, an elevated pool with operable window walls, and a sky-deck.

In May 2019, Ascent was named a recipient of a U.S. Department of Agriculture grant awarded through the Forest Service's Wood Innovations Grant program. The federal grant assisted with the testing needed to prove mass timber's ability to perform as well as traditional building materials like concrete and steel to meet U.S. building codes.

Plans for the project were unveiled in 2018. While the initial design included 21 floors, updates and subsequent approvals brought the total to 25 floors in March 2020.

The project has been presented at the 2018 international CTBUH conference in Dubai, the 2019 international CTBUH conference in Chicago, the 2019 International Mass Timber conference in Portland. 

Construction on Ascent began in August 2020, and the building was completed in August 2022.

See also 
 List of tallest wooden buildings
 List of tallest buildings in Milwaukee

References

External links 
 Ascent MKE

Buildings and structures in Milwaukee